Skeletonema is a genus of diatoms in the family Skeletonemataceae. It is the type genus of its family. The genus Skeletonema was established by R. K. Greville in 1865 for a single species, S. barbadense, found in the Barbados deposit [Jung 2009]. 
These diatoms are photosynthetic organisms, meaning they obtain carbon dioxide from their surrounding environment and produce oxygen along with other byproducts. Reproduce sexually (sexual reproduction is oogamous) and asexually [Guiry 2011].
Skeletonema belong to the morphological category referred to as centric diatoms. These are classified by having valves with radial symmetry and the cells lack significant motility [Horner 2002]. Skeletonema are cylindrical shaped with a silica frustule. Cells are joined by long marginal processes to form a filament [Horner 2002]. Their length ranges from 2-61 micrometers, with a diameter ranging from 2-21 micrometers [Hasle 1997]. 
They are found typically in the neritic zone of the ocean and are highly populous in coastal systems [Jung 2009]. The genus is considered cosmopolitan, showing a wide range of tolerance for salinity and temperature [Hasle 1973]. For example, they have been found in various aquatic environments such as brackish or freshwater. Skeletonema are found worldwide excluding Antarctic waters [Hevia-Orube 2016]. 
Some harmful effects these diatoms may have on an ecosystem are attributed to large blooming events which may cause hypoxic events in coastal systems. Additionally, they are known to cause water discoloration [Kraberg 2010].

References 

 "Descriptions of New and Rare Diatoms". R. K. Greville, Journal of Microscopy, 1865
 "Descriptions of new genera and species of Diatoms from Hong Kong". R. K. Greville, Journal of Natural History, 1865
 Hasle, G. R. and Syvertsen, E. E. 1997. Marine diatoms. In: Tomas, C. R. (ed.) Identifying marine Phytoplankon. Academic Press, Inc., San Diego. 5-385.
Horner, R. A. 2002. A Taxonomic Guide To Some Common Phytoplankton. Biopress Limited, Dorset Press, Dorchester, UK. 200.
Kraberg, A., Baumann, M. and Durselen, C. D. 2010. Coastal Phytoplankton: Photo Guide for Northern European Seas. Verlag Dr. Friedrich Pfeil, Munchen, Germany. 204.
Hevia-Orube, J. 2016. “Skeletonema species in a temperate estuary: a morphological, molecular, and physiological approach”. Diatom Research. http://dx.doi.org/10.1080/0269249X.2016.1228548
Jung, S. W. 2009. “Morphological Characteristics of Four Species in the Genus Skeletonema in Coastal Waters of South Korea”. Algae. Vol. 24. 195-203.
Hasle, G. R. 1973. Morphology and taxonomy of Skeletonemacostatum (Bacillariophyceae). Norw. J. Bot. 20: 109-137.

External links 
 
 
 Skeletonema at WoRMS

Thalassiosirales
Coscinodiscophyceae genera